A flight commander is the leader of a flight of military aircraft or the commander of a ground-based flight.

Flight commander may also refer to:

In the Royal Naval Air Service, the appointment held by a lieutenant commanding a flight.
The Flight Commander (film), a 1927 silent feature from Gaumont British
"The Flight Commander", a 1928 short story by John Monk Saunders
The Dawn Patrol (1930 film), retitled Flight Commander in 1938